Vicente Zarazúa (born August 27, 1944) is a Mexican former tennis player. He played during the 1960s and 70s, and his best achievement was winning gold medals at the demonstration and exhibition tennis tournaments at the 1968 Summer Olympics.

Vicente Zarazúa was born at Tacubaya (Mexico) in 1944. Both his parents, who moved to Mexico City from Guanajuato, were amateur tennis players and took part in interclub competitions, with his mother, Rosario, also winning the national championships. Both his older brothers, Federico and José María, played amateur tennis at the interclub level.

As a junior, Vicente had a winning streak at the national level that stretched from 1959 to 1962, winning during this period Mexican national youth championships four times each in singles, boy doubles and mixed doubles. At the international level, he reached the finals of 1959 Orange Bowl in singles (lost to Charlie Pasarell) and, in 1962, won this tournament in doubles with Joaquin Loyo-Mayo.

Zarazúa was playing for the Mexico Davis Cup team from 1964, overall during his career having taken part in 16 ties. He won 14 rubbers, mostly in doubles, and lost 9. During these ties he achieved some of his best results, beating, together with the national team, the Americans in 1969 and then Australians in 1975. In both cases, he won the doubles rubbers (with Rafael Osuna in 1969 and with Raúl Ramírez in 1975). Another one of his highest achievements was the double victory (with Osuna) at the demonstration and exhibition Olympic tennis tournaments in Mexico in 1968.

In 2008, Vicente Zarazúa was introduced to the Hall of Fame of Immortals by the Mexican Council for Sport and Professional Spectacles (COMEDEP).

References

External sources 
 Vicente Zarazúa at the Davis Cup website
 

Living people
Mexican male tennis players
Olympic tennis players of Mexico
Tennis players at the 1968 Summer Olympics
Tennis players from Mexico City
1944 births
Pan American Games medalists in tennis
Pan American Games silver medalists for Mexico
Tennis players at the 1963 Pan American Games
Central American and Caribbean Games gold medalists for Mexico
Central American and Caribbean Games medalists in tennis
Central American and Caribbean Games bronze medalists for Mexico
20th-century Mexican people